Lars Akerhaug (born 1981) is a Norwegian journalist and non-fiction author. He currently writes for the liberal-conservative periodical Minerva with a focus on Islamic extremism, and has previously written for newspapers Verdens Gang and Aftenposten, and as a freelancer.

Akerhaug has authored the investigative journalism books Norsk jihad (Norwegian jihad; 2013) about Norwegian Islamists, and En norsk terrorist (A Norwegian terrorist; 2015) about Hassan Abdi Dhuhulow, the Norwegian perpetrator of the 2013 Westgate shopping mall attack in Kenya. Both books received good reviews in Dagbladet. He was granted  100.000 from Fritt Ord for development of the book Siste jul i Kairo (Last Christmas in Cairo; 2016), about the persecution of Christians in the Middle East. Akerhaug is considered one of Norway's foremost experts on Islamic extremism, and is often referred to for commentary in Norwegian media.

Having publicly confronted his own past as a radical leftist and former member of the Workers' Communist Party (AKP) who once represented the Red Electoral Alliance (RV) in the Bærum municipal council, Akerhaug has produced criticism of contemporary leftism.

Published books
 2013: Norsk jihad: muslimske ekstremister blant oss. Kagge. 
 2015: En norsk terrorist: portrett av den nye ekstremismen. Kagge. 
 2016: Siste jul i Kairo: fortellingen om Midtøstens siste kristne. Dreyer.

References

1981 births
Living people
People from Bærum
21st-century Norwegian journalists
Norwegian non-fiction writers
Male journalists
Norwegian investigative journalists
Aftenposten people
Verdens Gang people